The West Riverside Mountains are a mountain range in Riverside County, California.

References

See also 
Riverside Mountains
Parker Valley

Mountain ranges of Southern California
Mountain ranges of Riverside County, California